One Dance, One Rose, One Kiss is a song written by Joakim Anrell, and originally recorded by the Refreshments on the 2001 album Real Songs on Real Instruments. as well as releasing it as a single the same year.

During the Kikki, Bettan & Lotta tours, the song was also performed, and a live version performed by Bettan and Lotta in 2002 appeared on the 2003 Kikki, Bettan & Lotta compilation album Live från Rondo.

Swedish dansband Donnez recorded the song on the 2004 album Se vår värld.

Ulf Georgsson wrote a Swedish-language lyrics-version, named En blick, en dans, en kyss, which was recorded by Scotts releasing it as 2001 single at the Mariann Grammofon label "Det bästa för mig" acting as a B-side. The Scotts recording charted at Svensktoppen for nine weeks between 8 September-3 November 2001, peaking at fourth position. As recorded by Scotts, the song also appeared on the 2008 album På vårt sätt.

References 

English-language Swedish songs
2001 singles
Swedish songs
2001 songs